An A-Z list of List of poets from Finland and poets who have written in the Finnish language with dates of birth and death:

A
Aleksanteri Aava (1883–1956)

B
 Christina Regina von Birchenbaum

C
Paavo Cajander (1846–1913)

F
Kati-Claudia Fofonoff (born 1947)

Paavo Haavikko (born 1931)
Martti Haavio (1899–1973)
Helvi Hämäläinen (1907–1998)
Aaro Hellaakoski (1893–1952)
Anselm Hollo (1934-2013)

I
Jouni Inkala (born 1966)
Markku Into (born 1945)

J
 Helvi Juvonen (1919–1959)

K
Uuno Kailas (1901–1933), poet, author, translator
Viljo Kajava (1909–1998), poet and writer
Ilmari Kianto, also known as  Ilmari Calamnius and Ilmari Iki-Kianto (1874–1970)
Väinö Kirstinä
Veikko Antero Koskenniemi (1886–1962)
Julius Krohn (1835–1888), folk poetry researcher, professor of Finnish literature, poet, hymn writer, translator and journalist
Kirsi Kunnas (born 1924), poet, children's literature author and translator

L
Jarkko Laine
Joel Lehtonen
Eino Leino

M
Eeva-Liisa Manner
Otto Manninen
Arto Melleri
Barbara Catharina Mjödh

P
Larin Paraske (1833–1904)
Jyrki Pellinen

R
Risto Rasa
Elsa Rautee
Mirkka Rekola
Johan Ludvig Runeberg

S
Pentti Saarikoski
Kaarlo Sarkia
Juhani Siljo
Maria Simointytär
Axel Gabriel Sjöström
Edith Södergran

T
Ole Torvalds

U
 Uusitalo Arja

V
Katri Vala
Nils-Aslak Valkeapää
Lauri Viita
Einari Vuorela

Y
A. W. Yrjänä

External links

Lists of poets

 
Finnish poetry
Lists of poets by nationality
Poets